The 2014 DBL Playoffs was the postseason tournament of the Dutch Basketball League's (DBL) 2013–14 season. The tournament concluded with GasTerra Flames playing SPM Shoeters Den Bosch in the Final. The Playoffs started on 24 April and ended 1 June 2014.

Apollo Amsterdam made the postseason tournament for the first time in club history.

Playoff qualifying

Quarterfinals

(1) GasTerra Flames – (8) Apollo Amsterdam

(2) SPM Shoeters Den Bosch – (7) Aris Leeuwarden

(3) Port of Den Helder Kings – (6) Matrixx Magixx

(4) Zorg en Zekerheid Leiden – (5) Landstede Basketbal

Semifinals

(1) GasTerra Flames – (4) Zorg en Zekerheid Leiden

(2) SPM Shoeters Den Bosch – (3) Den Helder Kings

Finals

(1) GasTerra Flames – (2) SPM Shoeters Den Bosch

Dutch Basketball League playoffs
Playoffs